Harry Marion Szulborski (May 23, 1927 – August 4, 2017) was an American football player and coach.

Szulborski played college football as a halfback for Purdue University from 1946 to 1949 and was selected a first-team player on the 1947 and 1948 All-Big Nine Conference football teams. He led the conference with 631 rushing yards in 1948. He was later inducted into the Purdue Hall of Fame and Indiana Football Hall of Fame. Szulborski was drafted by the Green Bay Packers in the eighth round of the 1950 NFL Draft but did not play for the team.

In the early 1950s, he became an assistant football coach at Emerson High School in Gary, Indiana. He served as the school's head football coach from 1962 to 1974 and compiled a 36–81–3 record in that position. He also served as the school's athletic director from 1960 to 1969 and 1976 to 1981.

References

1927 births
2017 deaths
American football halfbacks
Purdue Boilermakers football players
High school football coaches in Indiana
Pershing High School alumni
Players of American football from Detroit